Dhimarkheda is a Tehsil of Katni District, in the state of Madhya Pradesh, India. The tehsil has 221 villages in its jurisdiction.

References

Tehsil in Katni